Andreis is a comune (municipality) in the Italian region Friuli-Venezia Giulia, located about  northwest of Trieste and about  north of Pordenone. 
 
Andreis borders the following municipalities: Barcis, Frisanco, Maniago, Montereale Valcellina.

References

External links
Official website

Cities and towns in Friuli-Venezia Giulia